DEBRA (formerly known as DebRA) is the name of an international medical research charity dedicated to the curing of epidermolysis bullosa, with national groups in over 40 countries (including the British and American) and growing.

History
"Debra" is the first name of the daughter of Phyllis Hilton, the original founder of the organisation in the UK, which began as a support group for parents, guardians and carers of other young children with the condition.

Although the backronym of Dystrophic Epidermolysis Bullosa Research Association has been used by DEBRA UK in the past, the organisation provides information, research funding and support for all forms of EB, not just dystrophic, which is one of three main sub-types of the condition; the others being EB simplex and junctional EB.

The DebRA US organisation have continued to use the aforementioned acronym DEBRA for the Dystrophic EB Research Association of America since their formation in 1980.

Work
Epidermolysis bullosa is a genetic condition that in its most severe forms affects all of the body's linings, the skin, the linings of the mouth and oesophagus, and even the eyes. In its most severe forms the linings blister or rip away from the flesh under the lightest of frictions. For example, rolling over in bed can cause skin to tear away from behind the ears, and the sufferer may wake up with up to 30 blisters each morning.

There is no treatment bar the lancing and draining of these blisters to stop their growth. Sufferers of the severest form die prematurely of skin cancer (their life expectancy is usually reduced by 30–40 years); in some, death occurs in infancy. Each day sufferers face a battle against fluid loss and infections due to open wounds. Blistering can also affect inner body linings, such as the mouth and throat. Sufferers of the severest forms have difficulties with eating due to the rawness in their mouths and often have to have a feeding tube fitted.

EB has a number of distinct forms: in the least severe form, blistering is confined to the hands and feet. In more severe cases, the whole body is affected and wounds heal very slowly, giving rise to scarring, physical deformity and significant disability.

In the UK
DEBRA UK is the national charity that supports individuals and families affected by EB. There are at least 5,000 people living with this devastating condition in the UK and 500,000 people worldwide.

DEBRA UK was founded in 1978 and provides an enhanced specialist EB nursing service, in partnership with the NHS, to deliver optimal healthcare to children and adults living with EB and community support staff to work directly with families. The charity also commissions world-leading research into the condition with the aim of finding effective treatments and, ultimately, a cure for EB. DEBRA UK has over 100 charity shops across the country run by combination of paid sales staff, volunteers, and people gaining work experience. Donations and proceeds from shops fund services for epidermolysis bullosa affected families and medical research into the condition. DEBRA UK's fundraising shops participate in the UK government's forced unpaid work programme where benefit claimants must work 20 to 40 hours per week uncompensated for periods that can be as long as six months. However, in 2015 DEBRA Trustee and current Vice Chairman Michael Jaega requested that DEBRA cease to take part in the program on the basis that DEBRA is a charity for disabled people and many of those disabled people, particularly those who suffer with EB, are unable to work due to the severe nature of their condition. The Workfare program was dropped by the government in 2017.

In the United States
Debra of America was founded in 1980 by Arlene Pessar and her son, Eric Lopez, who was born with epidermolysis bullosa. It is the only U.S. nonprofit organization that provides all-inclusive support to the EB community, through funding research for a cure and by providing free programs and services for those with EB. The mission of debra of America is to improve the quality of life for all people living in the United States with EB, their families, and caregivers, through free programs and services while funding research to find a cure and treatments for EB.

In 2015, Debra of America launched a series of TV and web commercials alongside a campaign titled #ItWontHurtToWatch These commercials, produced by award-winning health and wellness advertising agency HAVAS Worldwide Tonic, are meant to spread awareness of the debilitating rare disease.

Other countries
A list of national groups may be found at DEBRA International.

References

External links
Official DEBRA International site
EB Nurse site
EB Info World site
 Sufferers site
DEBRA United Kingdom Site
debra of America site

Bracknell Forest
Dermatology organizations
Health charities in the United Kingdom
Health in Berkshire
International organisations based in Vienna
Organisations based in Berkshire